HMCS Outarde (pennant J161) was a  constructed for the Royal Canadian Navy during the Second World War. Entering service in 1941, the ship spent the entire war on the West Coast of Canada. Following the end of the war, the vessel was sold in 1946 for mercantile conversion and renamed Psing Hsin. In 1950 the vessel was sold again and renamed Content and remained in service until broken up for scrap in 1951.

Design and description
They came in two versions powered by different engines; those with a diesel engines and those with vertical triple-expansion steam engines. Outarde was of the latter design and was larger than her diesel-engined cousins. She had a complement of 6 officers and 77 enlisted.

Outarde had two vertical triple-expansion steam engines, each driving one shaft, using steam provided by two Admiralty three-drum boilers.

The minesweeper was armed initially with a single quick-firing (QF) /40 caliber Mk IV gun mounted forward that was later replaced with a single QF  20 cwt gun mounted forward. The ship was also fitted with a QF 2-pounder Mark VIII aft and was eventually fitted with single-mounted QF 20 mm Oerlikon guns on the bridge wings. Those ships assigned to convoy duty were armed with two depth charge launchers and four chutes to deploy their 40 depth charges.

Operational history
The minesweeper was ordered as part of the 1939–40 building programme. The ship's keel was laid down by North Vancouver Ship Repairs Ltd. at their yard in North Vancouver, British Columbia. Named for a bay in Quebec, Outarde was launched on 27 January 1941 and commissioned into the Royal Canadian Navy at Vancouver on 4 December 1941.

Outarde spent the entirety of the Second World War on the West Coast of Canada. Assigned to the patrol units Esquimalt Force (operating out of Esquimalt, British Columbia) or Prince Rupert Force (operating out of Prince Rupert, British Columbia), the main duty of Bangor-class minesweepers after commissioning on the West Coast was to perform the Western Patrol. This consisted of patrolling the west coast of Vancouver Island, inspecting inlets and sounds and past the Scott Islands to Gordon Channel at the entrance to the Queen Charlotte Strait and back. On 13 July 1942,  Outarde, the corvette  and the American destroyer  escorted four American troop transports carrying 5,000 Canadian troops from Esquimalt for the invasion of Kiska.

Following the war Outarde was paid off on 24 November 1945 at Esquimalt. The vessel was sold for mercantile conversion in 1946 and renamed Psing Hsin. Registered in Shanghai the  vessel was owned by Chung Yuan SN Co. The vessel was sold in 1950 to Transcontinental Corporation, registered in Monrovia and renamed Content. The merchant ship was broken up in Hong Kong beginning on 13 January 1951.

References

Notes

Citations

Sources

External links
 
 

 

Bangor-class minesweepers of the Royal Canadian Navy
Ships built in British Columbia
1941 ships
World War II minesweepers of Canada